Alberto Colajanni (born 3 December 1973) is an Italian former professional boxer who competed from 1999 to 2006. He challenged for the WBC super-middleweight title in 2006.

Professional career
Colajanni held the Italian super-middleweight title between 2002 and 2004 and the IBF International title between 2004 and 2005. After losing his first world title shot against WBC champion Markus Beyer in January 2006, Colajanni retired with a record of 18 wins (2 by knockout) and 1 loss.

Professional boxing record

External links

1973 births
Living people
Super-middleweight boxers
Italian male boxers